The Stephen Lewis Foundation is a non-governmental organization that assists mostly AIDS- and HIV-related grassroots projects in Africa.

History

The foundation was started by Stephen Lewis, a veteran Canadian politician and former Canadian ambassador to the United Nations. He first proposed the idea in an interview published in The Globe and Mail newspaper on January 4, 2007, citing the crisis of HIV/AIDS in sub-Saharan Africa. Several readers responded with financial donations, the first of which arrived before the foundation had been formally established. By the time the foundation's first cheques were mailed out in June 2003 for projects, the donations totaled $275,000. As of 2014, the foundation's website indicates that it has disbursed over $80 million to more than 1100 initiatives in sub-Saharan Africa.

For his efforts in starting the foundation, Lewis was named as person of the year by Maclean's magazine 2003 and was awarded the Pearson Peace Medal in 2004. He continues to travel and speak on the foundation's behalf. Lewis's daughter, Ilana Landsberg-Lewis, has been the foundation's executive director since its formation in 2003, and its African Advisory Board is chaired by Graça Machel.

Activities

The Stephen Lewis Foundation is mandated to provide care for women suffering from HIV/AIDS, to assist orphans and other children affected by AIDS, to support grandmothers caring for orphaned grandchildren, and to support groups of people living with HIV/AIDS.

On March 7, 2006, the foundation launched the "Grandmothers to Grandmothers" campaign to encourage grandmothers in Canada to raise funds and awareness on behalf of African grandmothers caring for children orphaned by AIDS. More than forty groups were started across Canada in the first five months of the initiative. The first "Grandmothers to Grandmothers gathering" took place at George Brown College at the University of Toronto in August 2006, attended by two hundred grandmothers from Canada and one hundred from sub-Saharan Africa. Several groups from the Grandmothers to Grandmothers Campaign were profiled in Grandmother Power, a book by photojournalist Paola Gianturco.

On September 7, 2013, the foundation hosted a people’s tribunal in Vancouver, B.C. to shine a light on the discrimination and inequality faced by African grandmothers who are supporting communities and children affected by HIV/AIDS. Six grandmothers from across sub-Saharan Africa presented personal testimonies to four Tribunal judges: Theo Sowa, Mary Ellen Turpel-Lafond, Joy Phumaphi and Gloria Steinem.

Approach to Funding 
The foundation mostly supports small frontline groups and charities, although on some occasions it has provided larger projects with money. It has supported initiatives in Botswana, the Democratic Republic of the Congo, Eswatini, Ethiopia, Kenya, Lesotho, Malawi, Mozambique, Namibia, Rwanda, South Africa, Tanzania, Uganda, Zambia, and Zimbabwe.

The foundation’s approach to funding is based on the principle that community-based organizations are best poised to respond effectively to the HIV/AIDS crisis. In evaluating funding applications from prospective partners, the foundation places particular emphasis on the involvement of women, community members, and people living with HIV and AIDS in decision-making processes.

References

External links
Official site
A Portrait of HIV/AIDS in Sub-Saharan Africa, a photo essay in Walrus Magazine

HIV/AIDS in Africa
Health charities in Canada